Vexillum fortiplicatum is a species of small sea snail, marine gastropod mollusk in the family Costellariidae, the ribbed miters.

Description
The length of the shell varies between 8 mm and 12 mm.

Distribution
This marine species occurs off the Tuamotu Islands and off the Marianas Islands to New Caledonia, off the Hawaiian Islands.

References

External links
 Pease W.H. (1868 ["1867"]). Descriptions of marine Gasteropodæ, inhabiting Polynesia. American Journal of Conchology. 3(3): 211–222 
 Hervier, J. (1897). Descriptions d'espèces nouvelles de l'archipel de la Nouvelle-Calédonie. Journal de Conchyliologie. 45(1): 47-69
 Cate, J.M. (1963). Revision of Dall's Hawaiian mitrids with descriptions of three new species (Mollusca: Gastropoda). The Veliger. 6(1): 23-43, pls 5-8.
 Gastropods.com: Vexillum (Costellaria) fortiplicatum

fortiplicatum
Gastropods described in 1868